Mama Mia Trattoria is an Italian restaurant housed in Portland, Oregon's Waldo Block, in the United States.

History
Lisa Schroeder opened the restaurant in 2004, and served as chef and owner (along with Mother's Bistro), until she sold the business to Barry Brown of Brown Family Restaurants in mid 2011.

The restaurant began serving weekend brunch in 2013.

Reception
Mama Mia Trattoria was named Portland's best Italian restaurant by The Oregonian readers in 2016. The restaurant was also praised for its happy hour options.

See also
 List of Italian restaurants

References

External links

 

2004 establishments in Oregon
Italian restaurants in Portland, Oregon
Restaurants established in 2004
Southwest Portland, Oregon